Thomas Rice may refer to:
 Thomas Rice (1654) (1654–1747), Massachusetts colonial legislator and founder of Westborough, Massachusetts
 Thomas Rice (1734) (1734–1812), Massachusetts state legislator and judge
 Thomas Rice (1768) (1768–1854), U.S. Representative from Massachusetts, 1815–19
 Thomas D. Rice (1808–1860), American performer in minstrel shows
 Thomas O. Rice (born 1960), United States federal judge
 Thomas Maurice Rice (born 1939), Irish-American theoretical physicist
 W. Thomas Rice, American railroad executive

See also
 Tom Rice (born 1957), politician
 Thomas Spring Rice (disambiguation)
 Tom Reiss (born 1964), American author, historian, and journalist